A Civil Campaign: A Comedy of Biology and Manners is a science fiction novel by American writer Lois McMaster Bujold, first published in September 1999. It is a part of the Vorkosigan Saga, and is the thirteenth full-length novel in publication order. It is included in the 2008 omnibus Miles in Love.  The title is an homage to the Georgette Heyer novel A Civil Contract and, like Heyer's historical romances, the novel focuses on romance, comedy, and courtship.  It is dedicated to "Jane, Charlotte, Georgette, and Dorothy", novelists Jane Austen, Charlotte Brontë, Georgette Heyer, and Dorothy L. Sayers.

Plot summary

Miles Vorkosigan wants to woo Ekaterin Vorsoisson, recently widowed during the thwarting of a terrorist plot in Komarr, but fearing that openly courting her would drive her away, he takes an indirect approach: he hires her to design a garden beside Vorkosigan House so he can spend time with her.

His clone brother Mark also has romance problems. He and Kareen Koudelka became lovers at Beta Colony, but the sexual mores of conservative Barrayar are much stricter, and she keeps their relationship a secret from her family. When it finally surfaces, Kareen's parents take it very badly. Miles recommends his brother involve their mother, the formidable Lady Vorkosigan. She persuades Kareen's parents to accept their relationship.

A significant subplot involves Mark's first entrepreneurial venture: an ugly genetically engineered insect called the "butter bug," capable of eating all kinds of waste organic material of Earth origin and regurgitating a nutritious goo that Miles disparagingly calls "bug vomit".

Meanwhile, two seats on the powerful Council of Counts are up for grabs. Count Rene Vorbretten has been found to be part Cetagandan, dating back to the brutal Cetagandan occupation of Barrayar. The vacancy created by the death of Count Pierre Vorrutyer is contested by a distant cousin, Richars, and Pierre's sister, Donna, who undergoes gender reassignment surgery at Beta Colony, becoming a fully functional man and taking the name Dono, in order to seek the title. Miles gets involved on behalf of Count Vorbretten and Dono Vorrutyer after Richars antagonizes him.

Miles cannot stop himself from informing several people close to him about his secret courtship. This proves to be a colossal blunder. He hosts a dinner party to introduce Ekaterin to his friends, at which his secret is inadvertently revealed to all, causing Miles to panic and propose. His political enemies seize the opportunity to spread rumors that he killed or had killed Ekaterin's husband, and because of the top secret nature of the Komarran plot foiled by Miles and Ekaterin in Komarr, he cannot defend himself.

On the eve of the voting for both countships, Richars has his henchmen try to castrate his rival. Unaware that his men have failed, Richars addresses the Council of Counts, making innuendos about Miles' alleged murderous ways. This provokes Ekaterin into publicly proposing to Miles, which he instantly accepts. Then Ivan, Dono and two of the most influential conservative counts arrive. The counts make it clear that they (and their faction) no longer support Richars, not due to his crime but rather his bungling of it. Dono becomes the next Count Vorrutyer and Rene retains his title.

The novel concludes with the wedding of Emperor Gregor of Barrayar.

Reception
A Civil Campaign was a finalist for the 2000 Hugo Award for Best Novel, the 2000 Nebula Award for Best Novel and the 2000 Locus Award for Best Science Fiction Novel.

Publishers Weekly called the novel "sprightly" and "enormously satisfying", lauding Bujold's ability to combine "quirky humor, (...) just enough action, a dab of feminist social commentary and her usual superb character development " Kirkus Reviews described it as "(i)nviting if sometimes overembellished folderol, with an agreeable sense of humor".

The SF Site (reviewing the audiobook) lauded it as an excellent example of a Regency romance within science fiction, with "absolutely wonderful character moments for everybody, not just the romantic leads", and "one of the best love letters (...) this side of Persuasion". Infinity Plus praised Bujold's "subtle plotting and genuine wit", calling it "truly superior farce, rich with incident and characters" and faulting it only for the extent to which it benefits from a familiarity with the previous Vorkosigan novels.

Cheryl Morgan, analyzing the novel's approach to transgender issues, noted that "the nice characters in the book react positively to Dono, whereas the nasty characters recoil in horror", but stated that he is "a very unconvincing portrait of a trans person". In particular, Morgan emphasized that "(t)here's no suggestion that [Donna] wants to be a man for any reasons other than to secure the title [of Count], and for intellectual curiosity", and that "(f)or [Dono], changing gender is just a lifestyle choice." Aside from this "one very important caveat", however, Morgan found the novel to be "a lot of fun" and "remarkably readable".

References

External links 
 Sample chapters from the Baen Webscriptions site
 A Reader's Companion to A Civil Campaign (compiled by members of the Bujold chat-list to celebrate the Silver Anniversary of the Vorkosiverse, and freely available at the Bujold Nexus)

1999 American novels
1999 science fiction novels
American science fiction novels
Novels by Lois McMaster Bujold
Vorkosigan Saga
English-language novels
Novels with transgender themes
1990s LGBT novels
American LGBT novels
LGBT speculative fiction novels